Caeau Ffos Fach is a Site of Special Scientific Interest in Carmarthen & Dinefwr, Wales. Part of this SSSI is a nature reserve owned by the charity Butterfly Conservation primarily because of the population of the rare and legally protected butterfly species the marsh fritillary.

Geography
The Caeau Ffos Fach Site of Special Scientific Interest (SSSI) is one of three areas that form the wider Caeau Mynydd Mawr Special Area of Conservation (SAC), along with Caeau Lotwen and Broad Oak and Thornhill Meadows. There is a privately owned property on the site, Greengrove Farm.

The presence of a population of marsh fritillary butterflies has led to the site being designated a national nature reserve and is owned by the Butterfly Conservation charity, while Natural Resources Wales (NRW) also helps manage the site. The reserve was opened in 2003. Since 2006, cattle have been introduced in order to graze the area and scrub management is carried out annually by volunteers to maintain the site. The work by the Conservation has led to an increase in the numbers of the butterfly population.

A survey of the marsh fritillary butterflies carried out in the mid-1990s by the Countryside Council for Wales, a precursor to NRW, noted that Caeau Ffos Fach had the highest population in the Dinefwr Borough, with nearly 50% of the sightings recorded being listed at the site.

See also
List of Sites of Special Scientific Interest in Carmarthen & Dinefwr

References

Sites of Special Scientific Interest in Carmarthen & Dinefwr